Miklós Péter (27 April 1906 – 18 July 1978) was a Hungarian gymnast, born in Budapest. He competed in gymnastics events at the 1928 Summer Olympics, 1932 Summer Olympics, and the 1932 Summer Olympics.

References

External links

 

1906 births
1978 deaths
Gymnasts from Budapest
Hungarian male artistic gymnasts
Gymnasts at the 1928 Summer Olympics
Gymnasts at the 1932 Summer Olympics
Gymnasts at the 1936 Summer Olympics
Olympic gymnasts of Hungary
20th-century Hungarian people